The Man with the Gun is a 1938 Soviet history drama film directed by Sergei Yutkevich.

Plot 
The film takes place during the October Revolution, when the army is approaching the army of General Krasnov. Ivan Shadrin, a peasant who became a soldier, goes to Petrograd in order to convey a letter to Vladimir Lenin with questions that concern his comrades.

Cast 
 Maksim Shtraukh as Vladimir Lenin
Mikheil Gelovani as Joseph Stalin (removed from cut version)
Boris Tenin as Ivan Shadrin
 Vladimir Lukin as Nikolai Chibisov
Zoya Fyodorova as Katya
Faina Ranevskaya as mansion owner, séance psychic (uncredited)
Boris Chirkov as Yevtushenko
Nikolay Cherkasov as general
Nikolai Sosnin as Zakhar Zakharovich Sibirtsev, millionaire
Serafima Birman as Varvara Ivanovna, his wife
 Mark Bernes as Kostya Zhigilyov
Stepan Kayukov as Andrei Dymov, sailor
Pavel Sukhanov as Matushkin, captive
Konstantin Sorokin as honor guard
 Nikolai Kryuchkov as Sidorov
Pavel Kadochnikov as soldier with seeds
Mikhail Yanshin as officer, séance guest
Yuri Tolubeyev as revolutionary sailor
Pyotr Aleynikov as soldier
Vladimir Volchik as soldier
Yelizaveta Uvarova as freeloader
Vasili Vanin as general's batman

References

External links 
 

1938 drama films
1938 films
1930s historical drama films
Films about Vladimir Lenin
Cultural depictions of Joseph Stalin
Films scored by Dmitri Shostakovich
Lenfilm films
1930s Russian-language films
Russian Civil War films
Soviet black-and-white films
Soviet historical drama films

Soviet revolutionary propaganda films